Kyohei Inukai may refer to one of 2 deceased artists:
Kyohei Inukai (b 1886)
Kyohei Inukai (b 1913)